Paul Luna is a restaurateur, author, and political activist who has opened a training kitchen for refugee women, Lunacy Black Market, in downtown Atlanta.

Background
Called "mad genius" and "rebel chef," Luna has been a controversial ground-breaker on the Atlanta restaurant scene since the early 1990s, often critical of local trendiness and faddish tastes.  He introduced European, Mediterranean, and South American cuisine through his restaurants Luna Si, Eclipse di Luna and Loca Luna, and was widely known as a "bad boy" who ruled his dining room impetuously, sometimes staging impromptu striptease dances to amuse and shock patrons.
He advocates small businesses run by mixed-income, multi-national owners as the way to rejuvenate the historic downtown area.  "We're still segregated," he says. "All my white customers think, downtown: black. Period."

He worked with BryAnn Chen, executive director of Refugee Women's Network, to identify appropriate candidates for employment in this restaurant. In recent interviews regarding his new restaurant and business disputes with the city, Luna has declared his intention to run for mayor of Atlanta.

Career
Luna's far-flung career includes work with some of the world's finest chefs in some of the world's most reputed establishments, including Michele Attali at Petrossian in Paris, Terrance Brennan at New York City's Picholine, and Gianni Scappin of BiCE Ristorante, Milan. He also opened and ran successful establishments in Washington, Italy, and Canada. Luna's tenure with Four Seasons Resort Maui at Wailea, Hawaii, gave him the opportunity to lead cooking classes for children through the Big Brothers Big Sisters of Maui program.

Personal information
Luna was born in the Dominican Republic, and has published a bilingual children's book, "Luna Needs a Miracle/Luna Necesita un Milagro," based on his childhood efforts to learn English.  His wife and partner, public relations and communications strategist Cynthia Thomet, drove with him as he bicycled across the country to promote the book in the fall of 2009.

References

External links
Lunacy Black Market

Year of birth missing (living people)
Writers from Atlanta
Dominican Republic emigrants to the United States
American restaurateurs
Living people
American chefs
American male chefs